Frank Robinson (1935–2019) was an American baseball player and manager.

Frank Robinson may also refer to:

Arts and entertainment
Frank M. Robinson (1926–2014), American science fiction writer
Frank Robinson (Xylophone Man) (1932–2004), English busker in Nottingham, United Kingdom
Sugar Chile Robinson (Frank Isaac Robinson, born 1938), American blues and boogie-woogie musician

Sports
Frank Robinson (ice hockey) (fl. 1911–1917), Canadian ice hockey executive and soldier
Frank Robinson (jockey) (1898–1919), American Champion horse racing jockey
Frank Robinson (Canadian football) (born 1959), American football linebacker
Frank Robinson (American football) (born  1969), American football cornerback 
Frank Robinson (basketball) (born 1984), American professional basketball player

Others
Frank Mason Robinson (1845–1923), American businessman who named Coca-Cola
Frank W. Robinson (1853–1922), American politician and lawyer from Maine
Frank B. Robinson (1886–1948), American Baptist minister
Frank Norman Robinson (1911–1997), Australian ornithologist
Frank D. Robinson (1930-2022), American businessman and helicopter designer

See also
Franks Robinson (1886–1949), Irish Olympic field hockey player
Francis Robinson (disambiguation)